The 2003–2004 FIG Artistic Gymnastics World Cup series was a series of stages where events in men's and women's artistic gymnastics were contested. The series was a two-year long competition culminating at a final event, the World Cup Final in 2004. A number of qualifier stages were held. The top 3 gymnast in each apparatus at the qualifier events would receive medals and prize money. Gymnasts who finished in the top 8 would also receive points that would be added up to a ranking which would qualify individual gymnasts for the biennial World Cup Final.

Stages

Medalists

Men

Women

Medal table

Overall

Men

Women

See also
 2003–2004 FIG Rhythmic Gymnastics World Cup series

References

Artistic Gymnastics World Cup
2003 in gymnastics
2004 in gymnastics